Athīr al‐Dīn al‐Mufaḍḍal ibn ʿUmar ibn al‐Mufaḍḍal al‐Samarqandī al‐Abharī, also known as Athīr al‐Dīn al‐Munajjim (d. in 1265 or 1262 Shabestar, Iran) was an Iranian muslim polymath, philosopher, astronomer, astrologer and mathematician. Other than his influential writings, he had many famous disciples.

Life

His birthplace is contested among sources. According to Encyclopedia of Islam and Encyclopedia Islamica, he was born in Abhar, a small town between Qazvin and Zanjan. Encyclopedia Iranica mentions that he was born in Mosul, but according to Encyclopedia Islamica, none of his oldest biographers mentioned Mosul as his birthplace. Beside the city of Abhar, his epithet al-Abharī could suggest that he or his ancestors originally stem from the Abhar tribe. He may have died of paralysis in Adharbayjan.

He is said to have been a student or teacher in various schools at Khurāsān, Baghdad, and Arbil, living for some time in Sivas. Ibn Khallikān reports that he was student of Kamāl al‐Dīn ibn Yūnus, but other sources state that he worked as an assistant to Fakhr al‐Dīn al‐Rāzī.

Works

 Astronomy
 Risāla fī al‐hayʾa (Treatise on astronomy).
 Mukhtaṣar fī al‐hayʾa (Epitome on astronomy).
 Kashf al‐ḥaqāʾiq fī taḥrīr al‐daqāʾiq, where he accepts the view that the celestial bodies do not change and maintains that stars have volition and it is the source of their motion.

 Mathematics
 Several works on Iṣlāḥ (Correction) of Euclid, one of which is an attempt to prove the parallel postulate, which was commented upon and criticized by Shams al-Dīn al-Samarqandī.

 Philosophy
  (Guide on Philosophy): a book dealing with the complete cycle of Hikmat, i.e., logic, natural philosophy, and metaphysics.
  (Commentary on Porphyry's Isagoge), a treatise on logic. Latin Translation by Thomas Obicini; Īsāghūkhī, Isagoge. Id est, breve Introductorium Arabicum in Scientiam Logices: cum versione latina: ac theses Sanctae Fidei. R. P. F. Thomae Novariensis  (1625).

Notes

References
  (PDF version)
 Brockelmann, C. "al- Abharī , At̲h̲īr al-Dīn Mufaḍḍal b. ʿUmar." Encyclopaedia of Islam. Edited by: P. Bearman, Th. Bianquis, C.E. Bosworth, E. van Donzel and W.P. Heinrichs. Brill, 2008. Brill Online.

Further reading

External links
 Isagoge of al-Ahbārī with Latin translation and a theological treatise by Thomas Obicini  (Gallica, Bibliothèque nationale de France).

1200 births
1265 deaths
13th-century Iranian mathematicians
13th-century astronomers
People from Abhar
13th-century Iranian philosophers